Love in the Big City is a 2009 romantic comedy film directed by Maryus Vaysberg. It is based on the first full-length film project by Kvartal 95 Studio with the support of ICTV. This is the first film of a trilogy about the adventures of three friends in search of true love. It stars Aleksey Chadov, Volodymyr Zelenskyy, and Ville Haapasalo.

Plot
The film takes place in New York. The main characters of the film are friends Igor (Volodymyr Zelensky), Artem (Aleksey Chadov) and "almost Russian" Finn Oleg (Ville Haapasalo). They work in America, and in their spare time they enjoy a life of hedonism.

Igor is a dentist. Oleg, nicknamed "Sauna", is an instructor in a women's fitness club group. Artem earns a living as a tour guide by showing New York to Russian tourists. He is married, but this fact does not prevent him from having affairs.

But one day the carefree life of friends comes to an end. At another party a strange looking man makes a toast for love and then corrects himself: "Let what you drank for, be impossible without what I drank for." At one point, all three completely lose the ability to have sex. The friends desperately attempt everything to regain their virility but all is in vain.

After long torment, friends find that same person from the party and it turns out that he is Saint Valentine (Philipp Kirkorov), who settled in America to help its residents find love. With the help of his mystical abilities he "programmed" them against promiscuity. Only finding love can help the friends, and sex can only be with a beloved woman. Igor, Artem and Oleg face many problems, and must go their own way to understand that true love is the most important thing in life.

Cast
Aleksey Chadov – Artem
Volodymyr Zelenskyy – Igor
Ville Haapasalo – Oleg  Sauna 
Vera Brezhneva – Katya
Svetlana Khodchenkova – Nastya
Anastasia Zadorozhnaya – Alisa
Olesya Zheleznyak – Pelageya
Alika Smekhova – neighbor Raisa Montievna
Liza Arzamasova – Vera, sister of Nastya
Philipp Kirkorov – Saint Valentine
Sabina Ahmedova – girlfriend of "Sauna"

Production
The film was produced in New York City, New York. The other films of this trilogy are Love in the Big City 2 and Love in Vegas.

References

External links

 YouTube - trailer
 IMDB - "Lyubov v bolshom gorode"
 Kvartal 95 Studio - Project "Кохання у великому місті"
 ICTV - "Кохання у великому місті"

Ukrainian romantic comedy films
Russian romantic comedy films
2009 romantic comedy films
2009 films
Films shot in New York City
Films set in New York City
Films directed by Maryus Vaysberg
Volodymyr Zelenskyy films
Russian sex comedy films
2000s sex comedy films
Slapstick films